Union Carbide India Limited (UCIL) was a chemical company founded in 1934. UCIL employed 9,000 people. UCIL was 50.9% owned by Union Carbide and Carbon Corporation (UCC) located in the United States and 49.1% by Indian investors including the Government of India and government-controlled banks. UCIL produced batteries, carbon products, welding equipment, plastics, industrial chemicals, pesticides and marine products. A UCIL facility located in Bhopal, Madhya Pradesh was responsible for manufacturing various chemical products this primarily included pesticides. In 1984, a gas leak happened at the UCIL plant in Bhopal, killing thousands of people, and harming victims by causing chronic illness. At the time of the disaster, UCIL was ranked twenty-first in size among companies operating in India. It had revenues of  billion (then equivalent to  million).

The formation of the pesticides and herbicides that were produced by Union Carbide was from carbaryl which is used as a base chemical in order to react with methyl isocyanate and alpha naphthol. In 1970, there was an issue with the methyl isocyanate unit being built (MIC) in Bhopal. The issues was due to the location of the unit which was nearby a railroad station and a heavily populated area. However, this did not stop the UCIL from moving forward with their plan even though it meant violating the 1975 Bhopal Development plan.

This was not the only violation pertaining to safety precautions the UCIL had taken. The way in which the company went about hiring people included hiring under-qualified candidates and providing them with no training. This job not only involved working with hazardous chemicals but also with various technological systems and machinery. Hiring those who were not qualified and providing no training meant the UCIL could under pay their employees. From the book Angry Earth: Disaster in Anthropological Perspective an excerpt titled; Bhopal Vulnerability, Routinization and Chronic Disaster that was written by S. Ravi Rajan focuses on the factors and aftermaths of the tragedy. Rajan claims the reason the UCIL did not take the necessary safety precautions was to prevent workers from mobilizing. If workers did mobilize this could lead to them gaining political support. This would force the company to hold themselves accountable for the inhumane working conditions. This provides evidence of the abuse UCIL employees were subjected to due to their corporate culture prioritizing their shareholders over peoples lives.

A case was filed against the company which consisted of multiple players and negotiations. The Indian government also filed a lawsuit right after the parentis-partial act passed. This act gave the victims of this tragedy representation. During the multiple lawsuits the company continued to deny any responsibility for the gas leak. Instead UCIL actively distanced themselves from the tragedy. For example, they hired a younger leader for the company who had no prior association to the gas leak. The company wanted to put the accident behind them and continue gaining profits. UCIL acted strategically after the gas leak by taking steps including purchasing stocks, and bond retirements. This led the mobilization of various victims which started the development of different activist organizations. Bhopal registered a claim of $10 billion, based on United States injustice claim standards. The lawsuit led to the Indian government gaining $3.3 billion. However, the final settlement came to $470 million. In 1994, UCC sold its entire stake in UCIL to Mcleod Russel India Limited of Calcutta, which renamed the company Eveready Industries India Limited. The proceeds from the UCIL sale ( million) were placed in a trust to fund a hospital in Bhopal to care for victims of the tragedy.

Dangerous impacts of the Bhopal disaster
The Bhopal gas leak happened in between the nights of December 2 and 3, 1984 due to Union Carbide Limited negligence and corporate culture. This gas leak killed thousands of people. Those who did survive were victims of a chronic cancer and other health related impairments. Rajan states since the tragedy has taken place it has partially become invisible to almost everyone including the survivors. UCIL refused to take responsibility, continued to distance themselves from the tragedy and provided no support in rehabilitation efforts to the victims.

In February 1989, the Supreme Court of India directed UCC and UCIL to pay $470 million to settle all claims arising from the tragedy. The government, UCC and UCIL agreed with the ruling, and the two companies paid the settlement on 24 February.

References

External links
International Campaign For Justice For The Victims Of The Bhopal Disaster
 CSIR Report on Bhopal Disaster, December 1985. 

Chemical companies of India
Bhopal disaster
Chemical companies established in 1934
1934 establishments in India
Indian companies established in 1934
Indian companies disestablished in 1994
Dow Chemical Company